Lakshan (Devanagari: लक्षण ) is a South Asian masculine given name. Some of the meanings of the Sanskrit word  are "mark, sign", "aim, goal", "lucky mark".  A related feminine given name is Lakshanya.

Athletes
 Lakshan Jayasinghe (born 1995), Sri Lankan cricketer
 Lakshan Madushanka (born 1990), Sri Lankan cricketer
 Lakshan Rodrigo (born 1987), Sri Lankan cricketer
 Lakshan Sandakan (born 1991), Sri Lankan cricketer
 Lakshan Somaweera (born 1996), Sri Lankan cricketer

Fictional characters
 Lakṣaṇa, a character from the Rajatarangini chronicle

References 

Indian masculine given names
Sinhalese masculine given names